Ali Mahammadali oglu Hasanov (born March 3, 1960) is a professor and an Azerbaijani politician who served as an assistant to the President for Public and Political Issues and Head of Department of Public and Political Issues, Presidential Administration of Azerbaijan Republic.

Early life
Hasanov was born on March 10, 1960, in Tananam village of Sharur Rayon, Nakhchivan AR, Azerbaijan. He graduated from Moscow State University and has a PhD in History. From May 19, 1992, until December 2, 1993, Hasanov worked as an inspector at the main office of Nakhchivan State University.

Political career
From February 23, 1994, until September 29, 1995, he was the Director of the Ideology Department of New Azerbaijan Party. Hasanov then worked as the Assistant Director of the Head of Department on Social Political Issues of the Executive Apparatus from September 30, 1995, until July 9, 1996, and as its head from July 9, 1996, through July 19, 2005. When the official name of the apparatus was changed to Presidential Administration, Hasanov was re-appointed to the same position. He was the Assistant to the President of Azerbaijan for public and political issues. On November 29, 2019 his department was abolished and position dismissed.

Political views
Hasanov was known for his nationalist-tinged vitriol against government opponents, which he labeled “anti-national elements” or “foreign anti-Azerbaijan forces.” One of his most common targets was foreign-funded democracy promotion efforts, which “mislead some of our young people to act against the state, funded from various filthy sources which push them to act in an unhealthy, anti-national way,” he told a pro-government youth group in 2013.

In 2010, he went so far as to propose the adoption of a “national” ending for Azerbaijani surnames, like the Russian “-ov” or the Georgian “-adze.” He suggested “-az,” but it never caught on.

Ambassador of the United States of America in the Republic of Azerbaijan Anne E. Derse in her dispatch to the State Department described him as "Hasanov is a blunt instrument, not a visionary thinker"

In 2020 Azerbaijani media sources wrote about links of Ali Hasanov and his son Shamkhal Hasanli with FETO organization.

On social media, Ali Hasanov was called the “father of trolls”, implying that he was the one who managed the Internet trolls who praise the government and attack those who voice complaints online.

In September 14, 2020 Turkish official newspaper "Turkiye" admitted Ali Hasanov's links with FETO.

Awards
In March 2010, Hasanov was awarded with Vətənə xidmətə görə (For Service to the Motherland) medal by the President Ilham Aliyev.

Family Business
In his interview to BBC Azerbaijan on June 27, 2014 Ali Hasanov confirmed that is proud for business of his family members. He confirmed that despite the fact that he holds public office, his family members are owners of Araz FM, Golden Prince LLC, Kaspi Global MMC, Kaspi Medical Center, “Mətbuat Evi” LLC, Kaspi – EC LLC, Kaspi Co. housing cooperative, Kaspi.Az, “Kaspi Mətbuat Yayımı” LLC, "Kaspi" newspaper, Xezer TV. His son Shamkhal Hasanli is the President of Xezer TV. On March 6, 2020 his son was fired and producer Murad Dadashev was appointed new head of Xezer TV. His son Shamkhal Hasanov was engaged in financing of FETO using proxies.

See also
Cabinet of Azerbaijan
Politics of Azerbaijan

References

Azerbaijani politicians
1960 births
Living people
People from Nakhchivan
Azerbaijani professors
New Azerbaijan Party politicians
Political office-holders in Azerbaijan